Übersbach is a former municipality in the district of Hartberg-Fürstenfeld in Styria, Austria. Since the 2015 Styria municipal structural reform, it is part of the municipality Fürstenfeld.

References

Cities and towns in Hartberg-Fürstenfeld District